Dick Humphreys (1896-1968) was a member of the Irish Volunteers and participated in the Easter Rising in 1916, serving in the General Post Office with his uncle, The O'Rahilly.  Born in Limerick in 1896, Humphreys was a son of Dr. David Humphreys and Nell Humphreys and a brother of Sheila Humphreys.  The family moved to Dublin in 1909 and was a pupil in Padraig Pearse's school, St. Enda's, in Ranelagh and later in Rathfarnham when the school moved there.  After the Easter rising, Humphreys was arrested and detained in Wakefield Prison where he wrote an account of the events of Easter week He was a member of the IRA during the War of Independence, 1919–21, and was imprisoned in Mountjoy Prison where he went on hunger strike.  In November 1920 he qualified as a barrister in King's Inns. As part of the 50 year commemoration of the rising in 1966 his reminiscences of Easter week were recorded by RTÉ.  An excerpt from his account of the rising formed part of the 2016 commemorative exhibition by the National Library of Ireland.

References

1896 births
1968 deaths
People from Limerick (city)
People of the Easter Rising
People from Dublin (city)
Irish barristers
People educated at St. Enda's School